Ostel is a hostel in Berlin. Located in an original Plattenbau, it is decorated in the style of Ostalgie. Sometimes in 2020, it has closed down.

It was inaugurated on 1 May 2007, and is decorated in the style of East Germany. Clocks display the time in Moscow, Beijing and Havana and the rooms are decorated with photographs of Erich Honecker.

References

External links
Ostel website

Hotels in Berlin
Communist chic
Ostalgie
2007 establishments in Germany
Hotels established in 2007